Jessica Schwarz (born 5 May 1977) is a German film and TV actress.

Life and career
Schwarz was born in Erbach im Odenwald and grew up in the small town of Michelstadt, Germany. She won a contest of the German teen magazine Bravo in 1993. Subsequently, she worked as a model and VJ for the music channel VIVA. In 2000 she started her acting career, but still occasionally hosts events, e.g. the German Film Award 2004. Schwarz separated from actor Daniel Brühl after a five-year relationship in 2006. She currently resides in Berlin.

Schwarz is probably best known outside Germany for her part in Perfume: The Story of a Murderer and as Tony Buddenbrook in the 2008 film adaptation of Thomas Mann's novel Buddenbrooks.

Awards
2002 New Faces Award (Best Actress) for No Regrets
2003 Adolf Grimme Award (Fiction/Entertainment) for the performance in The Friends of the Friends
2004 Bavarian Film Awards (Best Actress), for her performance in Kammerflimmern
2009 Bambi Award for her performance in

Filmography (selected)
2001:  (Nichts bereuen)
2002:  (Die Freunde der Freunde, TV film)
2003:  (Verschwende deine Jugend)
2004:  (Kalter Frühling, TV film)
2004: Off Beat (Kammerflimmern)
2004: Quito (TV film)
2006: Die Wilden Hühner
2006:  (Der rote Kakadu)
2006: Lulu (TV film)
2006: Perfume: The Story of a Murderer
2006: 
2006:  (Der Liebeswunsch)
2007: Why Men Don't Listen and Women Can't Read Maps
2008: Buddenbrooks
2009: Die Wilden Hühner und das Leben
2009: The Door
2009:  (TV film, depicting Romy Schneider)
2010: Lautlose Morde (TV film)
2010: 
2010: 
2011: Death of a Superhero
2012: Heiter bis Wolkig
2012: 
2012: 
2013: Adieu Paris
2014: 
2016: Zweimal zweites Leben
2016: 
2020: Biohackers

References

External links

Profile, film.virtual-history.com

1977 births
Living people
People from Erbach im Odenwald
People from Michelstadt
German television actresses
German film actresses
21st-century German actresses
German female models